First Person is a Canadian dramatic television series which aired on CBC Television from 1960 to 1961.

Premise
This dramatic anthology consisted of adapted and original stories whose teleplays were produced out of CBC Toronto.

This series is distinct from Adrienne Clarkson's First Person talk show in 1966.

Scheduling
This half-hour series was first broadcast over 20 weeks on Wednesdays at 10:00 p.m. (Eastern) from 8 June to 19 October 1960. Then it was given a full season on Wednesdays at 8:30 p.m. from 26 October 1960 to 8 February 1961.

Episodes
Some of the teleplays included:

June–October 1960
 The Anniversary (Basil Coleman producer; Michael Jacot writer)
 At the Railing (David Gardner producer; Robert Presnell, Jr. writer), starring Martha Buhs and Robert Goulet
 Aunt Jeannie and the Idol (Audrey Piggott writer)
 Bulgarian Bread (Paul Wayne writer)
 The Click of Beads
 Earn Money at Home (W. O. Mitchell writer)
 End of Innocence (Paul Almond producer; Vincent McConnor writer), starring Kenneth Wolff
 Final at Furnell (Melwyn Breen producer; Willis Hall writer), starring Bill Glover and Deborah Turnbull
 Harry (Ted Pope producer; Fletcher Barry writer; Rosemary Timperley adaptation)
 Kukla (Audrey Piggott writer)
 The Magnet (Harvey Hart producer; Hugh Garner writer), starring Don Francks and Charmion King
 The Man Who Knew A Good Thing (George McCowan producer; Herb Hosie writer), starring Michael Forest
 The Man With Two Hands
 Night River (Basil Coleman producer; George Salverson writer), starring Powys Thomas and Terry Carter
 Some Are So Lucky (David Gardner producer; Hugh Garner writer)

October 1960-February 1961
 The Gold Dress (Stephen Vincent writer)
 Guardian Angel (Frederick Hazlett Brennan story; Hugh Garner adaptation)
 Man in Town (John Gray writer)
 A Matter of Some Importance (Roy Shields writer)
 Overlaid (David Gardner producer; Robertson Davies story; Wallace Christie adaptation), based on Davies' theatre play, starring Alex McKee and Aileen Seaton
 The Trouble With Pyecraft (Eric Till producer, H. G. Wells writer; Douglas Cleverdon adaptation), a comedy starring Tony Van Bridge (Pyecraft) and Gillie Fenwick (Formalyn)
 Venice Libretto (Herb Hosie writer)
 Witness to Murder (Wenzell Brown story; M. Charles Cohen adaptation)
 A Woman Called Anne (Basil Coleman producer; Pamela Lee writer), starring Norma Renault, Ruth Springford, and Norman Welsh

References

External links
 

CBC Television original programming
1960 Canadian television series debuts
1961 Canadian television series endings